Stary Oskol is a city in Belgorod Oblast, Russia, located  south of Moscow. Population:  It is called Stary Oskol (Old Oskol) to distinguish it from Novy Oskol (New Oskol) 60 km south. Both are on the Oskol River.

History
It was near the Muravsky Trail used by Crimeans and Nogais to raid Muscovy. In 1571 a fort was built nearby. It was abandoned after 15 years, but the area was still patrolled. In 1593 Oskol was refounded as a fortress. In 1617 it was burned by the Poles. The surrounding area was frequently raided by the Tatars. In 1655 it was renamed Stary Oskol to distinguish it from the new fort at Novy Oskol. Later it was affected by the Russian Civil War in 1919, as well as by World War II, when it was captured by Hungarian troops. After World War II, industry developed in the city and its population started to grow.

Etymology
Accurately confirmed information about the meaning of the word Oskol does not exist today, but there are many hypotheses and assumptions. At present, two hypotheses are widespread.

Candidate of Historical Sciences, Anatoly Pavlovich Nikulov believes that the word “Oskol” is of Turkic origin, since the lands of modern Stary Oskol in the early Middle Ages were part of the Khazar Kaganate, being in constant proximity to the lands inhabited by ancient Slavic tribes. At the same time it was proved that the settlements appeared in the V century AD. er and the main occupation of the population was the mining of iron ores and the smelting of metal. Then these lands in the 9th — 10th centuries became part of Kievan Rus and remained frontier for two states, then the so-called “Wild Field”.

According to the second, the word "Oskol" can be divided into two: "Os" and "Kol". The first "Os" means Rus, the Russians, since it is known that in the 7th-8th centuries in Byzantium the people living in the northern Black Sea region were called the people of Ros and the Arabs took this word to their arsenal. But in the Turkic languages there is no clear pronunciation of the sound “R”, and it is replaced by a softening of the next sound, so instead of a clear “Ros” there was a softened “Os”. The word “Kol” in Turkic languages means “pond”, “lake” or “river”.

In  it is assumed that the word "oskol" is of Slavic origin and means splitting, crushing that is a technological procedure for grinding iron ore before smelting in a furnace ... This explanation fits well with the proximity to the ancient city of Oskol (now Stary Oskol) of a large iron deposit.

Administrative and municipal status
Within the framework of administrative divisions, Stary Oskol serves as the administrative center of Starooskolsky District, even though it is not a part of it. As an administrative division, it is incorporated of Microsoft separately as the town of oblast significance of Stary Oskol—an administrative unit with a status equal to that of the districts. As a municipal division, the territories of the city of oblast significance of Stary Oskol and of Starooskolsky District are incorporated as Starooskolsky Urban Okrug.

Economy
Stary Oskol is an important center of iron ore mining, situated at the border of the Kursk Magnetic Anomaly, one of the largest deposits of iron ore worldwide. Over eight million tons of iron ore are mined here per year. For this reason there is also a branch of the Moscow Institute of Steel and Alloys in the city.

Education
One of the oldest kids music schools in the city is located in the city center, on Lenina Street.

Notable people
Vasili Eroshenko, writer, translator, esperantist, linguist, poet and teacher.
Alexander Emelianenko, mixed martial artist
Fedor Emelianenko, mixed martial artist
Denis Lebedev, boxer

Twin towns – sister cities

Stary Oskol is twinned with:
 Salzgitter, Germany (1987)  
 Asenovgrad, Bulgaria (1989)  
 Mänttä-Vilppula, Finland (1989)

References

Notes

Sources

 
Starooskolsky Uyezd
Populated places established in 1593